KISU-FM (91.1 FM), is a National Public Radio member station in Pocatello, Idaho, owned by Idaho State University. KISU-FM originally went on the air June 4, 1999; and since the spring of 2000 has carried student hosted content. The first such student hosted show was In House with Jeremy Peterson. Since then KISU-FM has added more than a half dozen student hosted shows to its repertoire. Current General Manager is Jamon Anderson.

External links
KISU official website

NPR member stations
Idaho State University
ISU-FM
1999 establishments in Idaho
Radio stations established in 1999